Jim Spencer is a media entrepreneur. In 2008, he founded Newsy, a multi-source video news service that analyzes reports from international news sources and highlights the differences in reporting.

Newsy developed one of the first video news apps for the iPad, as well as publishing applications for iPhone, Android, and Windows Phone.

References

External links
 Huffington Post
 Ask.com Press Release
 VentureBeat
 Missouri Department of Economic Development
 TEDxMU

Living people
Date of birth missing (living people)
Year of birth missing (living people)